Michael Dacosta González (born 5 March 2005) is a Spanish professional footballer who plays as a midfielder for English club AFC Bournemouth.

Early life
Dacosta was born in Alicante, Spain, and began his career in the academy of local side Alicante CF. At the age of six, he was involved in a traffic accident while riding on the back of his father's motorcycle, suffering a bad injury to his right foot. As this was his stronger foot while playing football, he had to adapt his playing style, learning to favour his left foot instead.

Club career
Following his departure from Alicante, Dacosta joined Hércules, before his parents decided to move to England. They settled in London, and he played for a number of grassroots teams before his family moved again, to Portsmouth. While playing for another grassroots team in Portsmouth, he was offered a trial at professional side Bournemouth, who signed him after four weeks, despite the trial being scheduled for six.

Dacosta settled in to his new team well, notably scoring twice for Bournemouth's under-18s in a 2–0 win over Exeter City in the FA Youth Cup. In the 2022–23 season, he scored fourteen goals for the youth team, earning him a spot on the bench for a Premier League match against Brentford, though he did not feature.

International career
Dacosta is eligible to represent Spain through birth, Ecuador and Equatorial Guinea through his mother and father, respectively, Colombia through his maternal grandfather, and England by virtue of living in the country since he was young.

Personal life
Dacosta's younger brother, Malcom, is also a footballer, and currently also plays in the academy of Bournemouth.

References

External links
 
 
 
 

2005 births
Living people
Sportspeople from Alicante
Spanish emigrants to the United Kingdom
Spanish footballers
Spanish people of Colombian descent
Sportspeople of Colombian descent
Spanish people of Ecuadorian descent
Sportspeople of Ecuadorian descent
Spanish sportspeople of Equatoguinean descent
Association football midfielders
Alicante CF footballers
Hércules CF players
AFC Bournemouth players